Joseph Terrence Taylor (born 18 August 1997) is a Montserratian footballer who plays as a left-back or left midfielder for Cray Wanderers of the Isthmian League and the Montserrat national team. He has previously played for Welling United, Leatherhead, Burgess Hill Town, VCD Athletic, East Grinstead Town, Whyteleafe, Horsham, Hythe Town and Staines Town.

Club career

Welling United
Having come through the academy of Welling United, becoming their first graduate of their academy to progess to the first team, Taylor made his debut for the club on 25 November 2014, starting in a 1–0 victory away to Braintree Town. He agreed a one-year deal with Welling United in summer 2015. He joined Leatherhead on a one-month loan in September 2015. He was retained at Welling following the expiry of his contract at the end of the season, with Welling having been relegated to the National League South.

In August 2016, Taylor joined Burgess Hill Town on loan. He had spells on loan at VCD Athletic and East Grinstead Town later on that season.

Burgess Hill Town and Whyteleafe
In summer 2017, he returned to Burgess Hill Town on a permanent deal. Taylor scored once in 39 appearances for Burgess Hill Town. He joined Whyteleafe in April 2018. He scored once in 6 appearances for Whyteleafe.

Horsham and Hythe Town
Ahead of the 2018–19 season, Taylor signed for Isthmian League South East Division side Horsham. In February 2019, he switched to fellow Isthmian League South East Division side Hythe Town. He returned to Horsham in April 2019. Horsham finished second in the Isthmian League South East Division and qualified for the promotion play-offs. After coming on as a substitute at half-time in extra-time in the play-off final, he provided the assist for the winning goal with a free-kick headed in by Dylan Merchant in the 108th minute, confirming a 2–1 win over Ashford United and promotion to the Isthmian League Premier Division. Across the 2018–19 season, Taylor scored once in 29 appearances for Horsham, whilst he played four times without scoring for Hythe Town.

Staines Town and Sevenoaks Town
In June 2019, Taylor joined Staines Town of the Isthmian League South Central Division in search of regular first-team football. He scored twice in 23 appearances for Staines Town, prior to joining Sevenoaks Town of the South East Division on 1 January 2020.

Cray Wanderers
On 9 August 2021, Taylor signed for Cray Wanderers.

International career
Taylor, who is of Montserratian descent through his grandparents, made his international debut for Montserrat on 8 September 2018 and scored his first international goal for Montserrat in a 1–2 loss against El Salvador in a CONCACAF Nations League qualification match.

Style of play
Taylor can play either at left-back or left midfield.

Personal life
Taylor is the younger brother of fellow Montserrat international Lyle, who plays professionally for Nottingham Forest.

Career statistics

Club

International

Scores and results list Montserrat's goal tally first, score column indicates score after each Montserrat goal.

References

External links
 

1997 births
Living people
Association football defenders
English footballers
English people of Montserratian descent
Black British sportspeople
English Football League players
Welling United F.C. players
Leatherhead F.C. players
East Grinstead Town F.C. players
VCD Athletic F.C. players
Burgess Hill Town F.C. players
Whyteleafe F.C. players
Horsham F.C. players
Hythe Town F.C. players
Staines Town F.C. players
Sevenoaks Town F.C. players
Cray Wanderers F.C. players
National League (English football) players
Isthmian League players
Montserratian footballers
Montserrat international footballers